Pareto analysis is a formal technique useful where many possible courses of action are competing for attention. In essence, the problem-solver estimates the benefit delivered by each action, then  selects a number of the most effective actions that deliver a total benefit reasonably close to the maximal possible one.

Pareto analysis is a creative way of looking at causes of problems because it helps stimulate thinking and organize thoughts. However, it can be limited by its exclusion of possibly important problems which may be small initially, but will grow with time. It should be combined with other analytical tools such as failure mode and effects analysis and fault tree analysis for example.

This technique helps to identify the top portion of causes that need to be addressed to resolve the majority of problems. Once the predominant causes are identified, then tools like the Ishikawa diagram or Fish-bone Analysis can be used to identify the root causes of the problems. While it is common to refer to pareto as "80/20" rule, under the assumption that, in all situations, 20% of causes determine 80% of problems, this ratio is merely a convenient rule of thumb and is not, nor should it be considered, an immutable law of nature.

The application of the Pareto analysis in risk management allows management to focus on those risks that have the most impact on the project.

Steps to identify the important causes using 80/20 rule

 Form a frequency of occurrences as a percentage
 Arrange the rows in decreasing order of importance of the causes (i.e., the most important cause first)
 Add a cumulative percentage column to the table, then plot the information
 Plot (#1) a curve with causes on x- and cumulative percentage on y-axis
 Plot (#2) a bar graph with causes on x- and percent frequency on y-axis
 Draw a horizontal dotted line at 80% from the y-axis to intersect the curve. Then draw a vertical dotted line from the point of intersection to the x-axis. The vertical dotted line separates the important causes (on the left) and trivial causes (on the right)
 Explicitly review the chart to ensure that causes for at least 80% of the problems are captured

See also
Pareto distribution
Pareto chart
Pareto interpolation
Ishikawa diagram

References

Problem solving methods
Statistical charts and diagrams
Quality
Vilfredo Pareto